Thurles Gaels GAA is a Tipperary GAA club which is located in County Tipperary, Ireland. Both hurling and Gaelic football are played in the "Mid-Tipperary" divisional competitions. The club is centred on the town of Thurles and its hinterland and is a combination of three clubs: Thurles Kickhams, Rahealty and Thurles Fennellys. The club was formed in 2005 under the name "Thurles KRF" it later changed its name to "Thurles Gaels" in 2009.  In 2006 the decision was made to start a Juvenile Club.

Honours
 Mid Tipperary Minor B Hurling Championship (1): 2017 (Combo-Thurles Gaels & Moyne Templetouhy)
 Mid Tipperary Minor B Football Championship (2): 2000, 2017 (Combo-Thurles Gaels & Moyne Templetouhy)
 Mid Tipperary Under-21 B Football Championship (1): 1999
 Mid Tipperary Under-21 C Football Championship (1): 2002
 Tipperary Ladies Junior Football Novice Championship (1): 2012

References

External links
Official Site
Tipperary GAA site

Gaelic games clubs in County Tipperary
Sport in Thurles